Lyncar was a Formula One constructor from the United Kingdom.  They participated in only two grands prix, the 1974  and 1975 British Grands Prix, entering a total of two cars.

Lyncar's founder Martin Slater had built and raced his own cars in junior formulae before becoming a designer for Lola, Brabham and March. In 1971, Slater built a car to enter the British Formula Atlantic Championship, the first of a series of machines which led to the Lyncar 005 with which McLaren engine-builder and amateur racer John Nicholson won the 1973 and 1974 championships.

Based upon success in Formula Atlantic, Nicholson commissioned a Formula One chassis from Slater. Nicholson had by then established his own engine building business and was unable to spare the time for a full Grand Prix season. He was classified 17th (five laps behind) despite crashing in the heavy storm at the end of the race.

The car was later updated and entered for Emilio de Villota in the Shellsport International Series, winning a round in 1977 at Mallory Park.

Complete Formula One World Championship results
(key)

References 

 Team Profile at Grand Prix Encyclopedia
 Results from Formula1.com

Formula One constructors
Formula One entrants
British auto racing teams
British racecar constructors